"On Trial" was the first episode of the first series of the British television series, Upstairs, Downstairs. The episode is set in November 1903.

Due to an industrial dispute over extra payments for using newly introduced colour equipment, during which broadcasting unions refused to allow their members to use colour cameras, the first six episodes of the first series were shot in black-and-white, and when colour production resumed, the first episode was remade in colour. Two endings were made, which could be shown depending on whether the black and white episodes were broadcast by the channel. The original black-and-white version of this episode is believed to have been wiped.

Plot
Sarah Moffat is engaged at 165 Eaton Place, on trial. Rose Buck and Sarah become good friends. Sarah tells the staff she is French but is caught out in making out she is above her station.

References

Upstairs, Downstairs (series 1) episodes
1971 British television episodes
Fiction set in 1904